The following people were all born in, residents of, or otherwise closely associated with the American city of Abilene, Texas.

A–L

Coby Archa, contestant on reality competition television series Survivor: Palau
Alvin O. Austin (born 1942), administrator at Hardin–Simmons University
Brown Bannister (born 1951), music producer; winner of numerous Dove Awards; Abilene Christian University alumnus
Sammy Baugh (1914–2008), football coach at Hardin–Simmons University
Ken Baumann (born 1989), actor
Ray Berry (born 1963), linebacker who played for the Minnesota Vikings and the Seattle Seahawks
Gordon Bethune (born 1941), chief executive officer, Continental Airlines; Abilene Christian University alumnus
Marion Zimmer Bradley (1930–1999), fantasy writer; works include The Mists of Avalon and the Darkover series; Hardin–Simmons University alumnus
Doyle Brunson (born 1933), championship-level poker player; author; Hardin–Simmons University alumnus
Melinda Plowman (born 1941), actress
Chris Christian (born 1955), music producer; artist; songwriter for Elvis Presley, The Carpenters, Amy Grant, Ali Lohan, The Pointer Sisters, Al Jarreau; Vice Chairman/Managing Partner of Dallas Wings WNBA
Karen Christy (born 1951), model; Playboy magazine's Playmate of the Month; Abilene native
Isaac Cline (1861–1955), meteorologist; resident of Abilene
Randall "Tex" Cobb (born 1950), prizefighter; actor; Abilene native
Charles Coody (born 1937), professional golfer; twelve PGA Tour victories; one Masters Tournament victory; Abilene resident
Byron Cook (born 1954), Republican state representative for Navarro
Carole Cook (1924–2023), actress; protégé of Lucille Ball; Abilene native
Roy Crane (1901–1977), cartoonist; creator, Wash Tubbs, Captain Easy, and Buz Sawyer; Abilene native
Sonny Cumbie (born 1981), quarterback for the Los Angeles Avengers of the Arena Football League; Abilene native
Bonnie Curtis (born 1966), film producer; work includes Saving Private Ryan, A.I., and Minority Report; Abilene Christian University alumnus
Shae D'lyn (born 1963), actress; work includes appearing as Jane Deaux in the television sitcom Dharma & Greg; Abilene native
Jody Dean (born 1959), news anchor of KTVT, Dallas; Abilene Christian University alumnus
Holly Dunn (born 1957), country music singer-songwriter; Abilene Christian University alumnus
Novalyne Price Ellis (1908–1999), schoolteacher in Cross Plains, Texas; member of the National Forensic Hall of Fame; memoirist
Billie Sol Estes (1925–2013), financier; has accused Lyndon B. Johnson of a variety of crimes; Abilene native
Bob Estes (born 1966), American professional golfer; from Graham, Texas
Mark I. Fox (born 1956), Vice Admiral, U.S. Navy; Deputy Commander, United States Central Command; Deputy Assistant to the President and Director, White House Military Office; Abilene native
David Funderburk (born 1944), U.S. Ambassador to Romania (1981–1985); member, United States House of Representatives from North Carolina's 2nd congressional district (1995–1997); former professor, Hardin–Simmons University
Larry Gatlin (born 1948), actor; singer-songwriter
Stedman Graham (born 1951), businessman; motivational speaker; romantically linked with Oprah Winfrey; Hardin–Simmons University basketball player
Carol Hall (1936–2018), composer and lyricist; work includes The Best Little Whorehouse in Texas
Lou Henson (1932–2020), college basketball coach whose lengthy coaching career included four seasons at Hardin–Simmons University
Case Keenum (born 1988), former quarterback for University of Houston; quarterback for the Houston Texans (2012–2014), St. Louis/Los Angeles Rams (2014–2016), Minnesota Vikings (2017), and the Denver Broncos (2018–present)
Lonnie D. Kliever (c. 1931–2004), professor of religious studies; Hardin–Simmons University alumnus
John Lackey (born 1978), Major League Baseball pitcher for the Anaheim Angels (2002–2009), [Boston Red Sox] (2010–2014), St. Louis Cardinals (2014–2015), and the World Champion Chicago Cubs (2016–present) ; played in and won the 2002, 2013, and 2016 World Series
Deirdre Lovejoy (born 1962), actress; work includes The Talented Mr. Ripley
Max Lucado (born 1955), Christian author, preacher and broadcaster; Abilene Christian University alumnus

M–Z

Ed V. Mead (1921–1983), 17th Lieutenant Governor of New Mexico
Wayne Millner (1913–1976), Hardin–Simmons University football coach; professional football wide receiver; member, Pro Football Hall of Fame
Paige Moss (born 1973), actress; work includes Buffy the Vampire Slayer and Beverly Hills, 90210
Ty O'Neal, actor; member, Professional Rodeo Cowboys Association
Terry Orr, running back for the Washington Redskins
Caryl Mack Parker, country music singer-songwriter
Fess Parker, actor; work includes appearing as title character of the television series Daniel Boone; Hardin–Simmons University alumnus
Vinnie Paul, drummer and co-founder of heavy metal band Pantera 
Lee Roy Parnell, country musician
Paige Patterson, Southern Baptist theologian; seminary president; Hardin–Simmons University alumnus
Don Pierson, businessman; founder, Wonderful Radio London and Swinging Radio England radio stations; longtime Abilene resident; Hardin–Simmons University alumnus
Dominic Rhodes, running back for the Indianapolis Colts
Sid W. Richardson, oilman; cattleman; philanthropist; Simmons College (now Hardin–Simmons University) alumnus
Bill Sharman, Hall of Fame basketball player, coach, and executive
Jessica Simpson (born 1980), pop singer; actress
Justin Snow, long snapper for the Indianapolis Colts
Diane Stanley, children's book author
Rawson Stovall (born 1972), first nationally syndicated video game journalist in the U.S.
Steven Stucky, Pulitzer Prize-winning composer.
Hollis Thomas, National Football League defensive tackle
Jeanette Tillett, composer
Bulldog Turner, Pro Football Hall of Fame defensive back; Hardin–Simmons University alumnus 
Sarah Weddington, attorney; represented "Jane Roe" in the Roe v. Wade legal case before the United States Supreme Court; Abilene native 
Duane Whitaker, actor; work includes The Devil's Rejects

See also

 List of people from Texas

References

Abilene, Texas
Abilene